Fonti may refer to:

 Fonti, a settlement of Bognanco, a commune in the Province of Verbano-Cusio-Ossola, Piedmont, Italy
 Acquaviva delle Fonti, a town and comune of the Metropolitan City of Bari, Apulia, southern Italy
 Fonti Flora Plantation, a historic plantation house located near Monticello, Fairfield County, South Carolina
 Pejo Fonti, a comune (municipality) in the region of Trentino-Alto Adige, Italy

 Francesco Fonti (1948–2012), Italian criminal and member of the 'Ndrangheta
 Samantha Fonti (born 1973), Australian film composer and classically trained violinist